"Cling Cling" is a song by Japanese girl group Perfume, the second for their fifth album Cosmic Explorer.  It was released as a single in Japan on July 16, 2014. The B-side "Hold Your Hand" was released as a digital single on May 21, 2014.

Track listings

Charts

Certifications

References

2014 singles
2014 songs
Japanese-language songs
Perfume (Japanese band) songs
Song recordings produced by Yasutaka Nakata
Songs written by Yasutaka Nakata
Universal J singles